Narak-e Qasemi (also Romanized as Nārak-e Qāsemī) is a village in Jangal Rural District, in the Central District of Fasa County, Fars Province, Iran. At the 2006 census, its population was 41, in 8 families.

References 

Populated places in Fasa County